Salvatore "Totò" Schillaci  (born 1 December 1964) is an Italian former professional footballer, who played as a striker. During his club career, he played for Messina (1982–1989), Juventus (1989–1992), Internazionale (1992–1994) and Júbilo Iwata (1994–1997).

At the international level he was the surprise star of the 1990 FIFA World Cup, as he helped Italy to a third-place finish on home soil. Coming on as substitute in Italy's first game, Schillaci went on to score six goals throughout the World Cup, claiming the Golden Boot as the leading goalscorer, and received the Golden Ball as player of the tournament ahead of  Lothar Matthäus and Diego Maradona, who came second and third respectively. That year he also placed second in the 1990 Ballon d'Or, behind Matthäus.

Club career 
Born in Palermo, Italy, from a poor family, Schillaci started to play for an amateur team of his native city, Amat Palermo. He then signed in 1982 for the Sicilian club Messina, where he played until 1989 and showed his goal-scoring abilities, most notably winning the Serie B top-scorer Award during the 1988–89 Serie B season, with 23 goals. He then joined Turin club Juventus, and made his debut in Serie A on 27 August 1989. Juventus, the "Old Lady" of Italian football, was at the time suffering from the breakup of the wonder team which dominated Italian football in the 1980s, under manager Giovanni Trapattoni; Schillaci's arrival coincided with a return to form under the direction of former legendary Juventus goalkeeper Dino Zoff. He featured prominently for the Turinese club that season, scoring 15 league goals and 21 in all competitions in a very positive year, which ended with Juventus winning both the 1989–90 Coppa Italia and the UEFA Cup titles. Due to his clever, inventive, and aggressive attacking style, he was then selected by head coach of Italy, Azeglio Vicini, to play in the 1990 FIFA World Cup, to be hosted by Italy itself, despite being a novice in the arena of national team competitions.

After the end of the 1990 World Cup, Schillaci played one more year for Juventus, alongside his Italy attacking team-mate Roberto Baggio, before joining Internazionale. Schillaci ultimately fell short of the expectations of the Inter fans, as well as those of Juventus, mainly because of the physical troubles which he suffered after the 1990 campaign. In 1994, he joined Japanese club Júbilo Iwata, becoming the first Italian player to play in the J.League, and he won the J.League Division 1 title with the club in 1997. He retired in 1999.

International career 
After making one over-age appearance for the Italy Under-21 side, under Cesare Maldini, Schillaci made his senior international debut for Italy under manager Azeglio Vicini, on 31 March 1990, in a 1–0 friendly away win over Switzerland, in Basel. He was subsequently called up for Italy's squad for the 1990 FIFA World Cup, to be played on home soil.

At the 1990 World Cup, Schillaci replaced Andrea Carnevale during Italy's first match against Austria. He scored the decisive goal as the match ended with a 1–0 win for Italy. Against the USA, Schillaci again made an appearance as a substitute, but he started the next match, against Czechoslovakia, alongside Roberto Baggio. Italy won 2–0, with Baggio and Schillaci both scoring. Schillaci started alongside Baggio in Italy's next two matches of the knock-out stages, also opening the scoring in the round of 16 and quarter-finals, against Uruguay and the Republic of Ireland respectively, and set up Aldo Serena's goal against Uruguay.

For the semi-final match against defending champions Argentina, Gianluca Vialli replaced Baggio in the starting line-up, whereas Schillaci kept his place in the team. The match ended 1–1, with Schillaci scoring his fifth goal of the tournament, but Italy were eliminated after a penalty shoot-out, in which he controversially refused to take a penalty, stating injury as the reason for his choice.

After setting up Baggio's opening goal, Schillaci scored the winning goal in Italy's 2–1 win in the third-place match against England from a penalty, and won the Golden Boot, with six goals, as well as the Golden Ball Award for the best player of the tournament. Overall, he scored seven goals in sixteen caps for Italy between 1990 and 1991, scoring his only other goal for Italy in a 2–1 defeat away against Norway, in 1991, in an UEFA Euro 1992 qualifying match.

Style of play 
Schillaci was a small, quick, agile, and mobile striker, with an eye for the goal, and solid technique. A prolific, reliable, and opportunistic goalscorer, Schillaci was known in particular for his anticipation, reactions, and his excellent positional sense, which, along with his acceleration, enabled him to make attacking runs to beat opponents to the ball in the area, giving him the reputation for frequently being "in the right place at the right time". He was capable of finishing well both inside and outside the area, as well as from volleys, with powerful strikes, and was capable of scoring with his head as well as with his feet, despite not being particularly imposing in the air; he was also accurate on set pieces and effective on penalties. Although he was primarily known for his selfish and instinctive style of play, he was also capable of linking-up with and playing off of his team-mates, despite not being a particularly notable passer. Due to his goalscoring exploits, his former Messina manager Francesco Scoglio described him by saying he had "never seen a player who wanted to score as much as him."

Retirement 
Schillaci retired in 1999. Today he lives back in his native Palermo, where he owns a youth academy of football.

He appeared as a guest on Craig Doyle Live during UEFA Euro 2012. Former South African national team captain Steven Pienaar is nicknamed Schillo after Schillaci.

Personal life 
Schillaci's nephew Francesco Di Mariano is also a professional footballer.

Career statistics

Club

International 
Appearances by national team and year

Scores and results list Italy's goal tally first.

Honours 
Messina
Serie C: 1985–86
Serie C2: 1982–83

Juventus
Coppa Italia: 1989–90
UEFA Cup: 1989–90

Internazionale
UEFA Cup: 1993–94

Júbilo Iwata
J.League: 1997
Italy
FIFA World Cup third place: 1990
Individual
1990 FIFA World Cup: Golden Boot
1990 FIFA World Cup: Golden Ball
1990 FIFA World Cup: All-Star Team
Serie B Top-scorer: 1988–89
Ballon d'Or (2nd place): 1990
Onze d'Argent: 1990
Orders
 5th Class / Knight: Cavaliere Ordine al Merito della Repubblica Italiana: 1991

References

External links

1964 births
Living people
Footballers from Palermo
Italian footballers
Italy international footballers
Italy under-21 international footballers
Italian expatriate footballers
A.C.R. Messina players
Juventus F.C. players
Inter Milan players
Serie A players
Serie B players
Serie C players
1990 FIFA World Cup players
Expatriate footballers in Japan
Italian expatriate sportspeople in Japan
Júbilo Iwata players
J1 League players
Association football forwards
Italy B international footballers
UEFA Cup winning players
Knights of the Order of Merit of the Italian Republic